The Malhão is a Portuguese circle dance and song in  time from Estremadura. The first line of one version is "Malhão, malhão, o malhão do norte", which can be translated as "winnower, winnower, o winnower of the North." The form of alternate endings derives from the cossante or cosaute, a courtly sung dance originating in 11th century France. The dance is also preserved in Malacca and Goa.  The song also exists as the base of a fado, with local variations as in the "Malhão de Cinfães", "Malhão das Pulgas", and "Malhão de Águeda", all recorded by Amália Rodrigues.

References

Portuguese dances
Circle dances
...